Siguanea Airport  is an airfield serving Isla de la Juventud special municipality in Cuba. It is located near to the "Colony" tourist resort at the Siguanea gulf. It has no regular flights.

Facilities

References

Airports in Cuba
Buildings and structures in Isla de la Juventud